Igor Bareš (born 15 April 1966) is a Czech actor.

Selected filmography

Film
 The City of the Sun (2005)
 Pleasant Moments (2006)
 An Earthly Paradise for the Eyes (2009)
 Men in Rut (2009)
 Největší z Čechů (2010)
 Seven Days of Sin (2012)
 Nightline (2022)

Television
 Czech Century (2013)
 Burning Bush (2013)
 Případy 1. oddělení (2014)
 Mamon (2015)
 Vzteklina (2018)
 Četníci z Luhačovic (2017)

Play
 Naši furianti

References

External links
 

1966 births
Living people
Actors from Olomouc
Czech male film actors
Czech male stage actors
Czech male television actors
21st-century Czech male actors
20th-century Czech male actors
Czech male voice actors
Janáček Academy of Music and Performing Arts alumni